The 1917 New York Yankees season was the 15th season for the franchise. The team finished with a record of 71–82, finishing 28½ games behind the American League champion Chicago White Sox. New York was managed by Bill Donovan. Their home games were played at the Polo Grounds.

Opening game
The opening game was against the Boston Red Sox on April 11, 1917, at the Polo Grounds in New York. 16,000 fans were in attendance. The Yankees lost 10-3. Major General Leonard Wood attended the game and threw out the first ball. Wood had drill sergeant Gibson, the recruiting officer from Macon, Georgia, where the team had their spring training, march the Yankees across the field in formation carrying rifles.

Regular season

Season standings

Record vs. opponents

Roster

Player stats

Batting

Starters by position 
Note: Pos = Position; G = Games played; AB = At bats; H = Hits; Avg. = Batting average; HR = Home runs; RBI = Runs batted in

Other batters 
Note: G = Games played; AB = At bats; H = Hits; Avg. = Batting average; HR = Home runs; RBI = Runs batted in

Pitching

Starting pitchers 
Note: G = Games pitched; IP = Innings pitched; W = Wins; L = Losses; ERA = Earned run average; SO = Strikeouts

Other pitchers 
Note: G = Games pitched; IP = Innings pitched; W = Wins; L = Losses; ERA = Earned run average; SO = Strikeouts

Relief pitchers 
Note: G = Games pitched; W = Wins; L = Losses; SV = Saves; ERA = Earned run average; SO = Strikeouts

References 

1917 New York Yankees team page at www.baseball-almanac.com
1917 New York Yankees at Baseball Reference

New York Yankees seasons
New York Yankees
New York Yankees
1910s in Manhattan
Washington Heights, Manhattan